Ljubljana is an album by saxophonist Mats Gustafsson and pianist Craig Taborn. It was recorded in concert in 2015 and released two years later by Clean Feed Records.

Recording and music
The album was recorded in concert at Cankerjev Dom, Ljubljana, as part of the Ljubljana Jazz Festival, on July 3, 2015. The two tracks, improvised, were credited to the two musicians. On the first track, "The Eyes Moving. Slowly.", Gustafsson employs slap-tonguing and vocalizations. "The Ears Facing The Fantasies. Again.", the second track, builds as "Taborn's percussive left hand churns the improvisation as he brings the piece to a boil, pressing Gustafsson to push his accelerator", then has a quieter section.

Release
Ljubljana was released by Clean Feed Records in 2017. They released it as an LP and as a digital download.

Track listing
"The Eyes Moving. Slowly." – 20:24
"The Ears Facing the Fantasies. Again." – 17:40

Personnel
Mats Gustafsson – slide saxophone, baritone saxophone
Craig Taborn – piano

References

Clean Feed Records albums
Craig Taborn albums